Kanal 5 (Channel 5) is a Danish subscription television channel operated by Warner Bros. Discovery EMEA, a subsidiary of Warner Bros. Discovery.
The station is broadcast to Denmark by satellite from London, showing mainly films, US drama shows and sports.

Kanal 5 aired the Danish version of So You Think You Can Dance.

Kanal 5 owns the Danish broadcast rights to show Spanish football from La Primera Division, and along with Canal Digital it shares the rights to show English Premier League football.

 Kanal 5 has bought the rights to show the James Bond movies.

Kanal 5 is distributed through cable and satellite.

References

External links
Official Kanal 5 site

Television stations in Denmark
Warner Bros. Discovery networks
Television channels and stations established in 2000
Warner Bros. Discovery EMEA